The 2021–22 season was the 123rd season in the existence of A.C. Milan and the club's 39th consecutive season (110th overall) in the top flight of Italian football. In addition to the domestic league, Milan participated in this season's editions of the Coppa Italia and UEFA Champions League. It marked Milan's return to Europe's premier knockout competition for the first time since the 2013–14 season.

Milan secured their 19th Italian league title on the last match day of the season, with a club-record tally of 86 points. It was their first league title since the 2010–11 season.

Players

Squad information

.

Transfers

Summer window
Deals officialised beforehand will be effective starting from 1 July 2021.

In

Loan in

Loan returns

Total spending: 74.9M

Out

Loans ended

Loans out

Total income: €6.5M

Winter window
Deals officialised beforehand will be effective starting from 1 January 2022.

In

Loan returns

Total spending: 4.1M

Out

Loans end

Loans out

Total income: €2.0M

Pre-season and friendlies

Competitions

Overall record

Serie A

League table

Results summary

Results by round

Matches
The league fixtures were announced on 14 July 2021.

Coppa Italia

UEFA Champions League

Group stage

The draw for the group stage was held on 26 August 2021.

Statistics

Appearances and goals

|-
! colspan=14 style=background:#dcdcdc; text-align:center| Goalkeepers

|-
! colspan=14 style=background:#dcdcdc; text-align:center| Defenders

|-
! colspan=14 style=background:#dcdcdc; text-align:center| Midfielders

           

|-
! colspan=14 style=background:#dcdcdc; text-align:center| Forwards

|-
! colspan=14 style=background:#dcdcdc; text-align:center| Players transferred out during the season

|-

Goalscorers

Assists

Clean sheets

Disciplinary record

References

A.C. Milan seasons
Milan
Milan
Italian football championship-winning seasons